Mary Weir (17 March 1910 – 28 November 2004), known as Molly Weir, was a Scottish actress. She appeared as the character Hazel the McWitch in the BBC TV series Rentaghost.

She was the sister of naturalist and broadcaster Tom Weir.

Biography
Born in Glasgow and brought up in the Springburn area of the city, Weir began in amateur dramatics. In her early professional career, she was a well-known radio actress, featuring in many comedy shows, such as ITMA.  Her greatest theatrical success came in The Happiest Days of Your Life.

She made her film debut in 1949, and had a regular role as the housekeeper, Aggie McDonald, in the radio and television sitcom Life With The Lyons. During the 1970s and early 1980s she became famous as a writer, with several volumes of best-selling memoirs, notably, Shoes Were For Sunday. She also appeared in a series of television advertisements for Flash  the household cleaning agent. In 1969, she appeared in The Prime of Miss Jean Brodie starring Dame Maggie Smith. She and Helena Gloag played the Kerr sisters, the sewing mistresses of Marcia Blaine School for Girls. In 1970 Weir and Gloag reprised their collaboration in Scrooge, playing old sisters in debt to Mr Scrooge, played by Albert Finney.
 
In the 1970s she was one of the presenters of Teatime Tales, a television series broadcast by STV in which she recalled her childhood. The series also featured Lavinia Derwent and Cliff Hanley. In the 1980s, she lampooned this homely image in the comedy series Victoria Wood As Seen On TV and appeared in a pop video for The Bluebells 1983 hit "Young At Heart".

At the  1979 general election, Molly Weir was one of "a galaxy of stage and television stars" to appear at an election rally in support of the Conservative Party.

She is also the subject of the 1988 song "Molly's Lips" by The Vaselines, and later covered by Nirvana.

Following her death, Molly Weir's ashes were scattered on the banks of Loch Lomond, a favourite holiday location; and almost all her estate (of nearly £1.9 million), was bequeathed to charities.

Selected filmography

Comin' Thro the Rye (1947)
Floodtide (1949) - Mrs. McTavish
Madeleine (1950) - Bit Part (uncredited)
Something in the City (1950) - Nellie
Flesh and Blood (1951) - Margaret
Cheer the Brave (1951)
You're Only Young Twice (1952) - Nellie (voice, uncredited)
Forces' Sweetheart (1953) - Scots Maid
Small Town Story (1953) - Maid (uncredited)
The Diamond (1954) - Mrs. Sayer - Marline's Housekeeper (uncredited)
Life with the Lyons (1954) - Aggie
The Lyons in Paris (1955) - Aggie
John and Julie (1955) - Landlady
Value for Money (1955) - Mrs. Matthews (uncredited)
Let's Be Happy (1957) - Flower Girl
The Bridal Path (1959) - 2nd Waitress
Carry On Regardless (1961) - Bird Woman
What a Whopper (1961) - Teacher
The Prime of Miss Jean Brodie (1969) - Miss Allison Kerr
Scrooge (1970) - 1st Woman Debtor
Hands of the Ripper (1971) - Maid
Bless This House (1972) - Mary's Mother
Assassin (1973) - Drunk Woman
One of Our Dinosaurs Is Missing (1975) - Scots Nanny
Mr. Selkie (1979) - Grannie Ross
Captain Jack (1999) - Foula Operator

Books

References

External links

 

1910 births
2004 deaths
Actresses from Glasgow
Scottish television actresses
Scottish film actresses
Scottish memoirists
People from Springburn
British women memoirists